The 1978 Lamar Cardinals football team represented Lamar University in the 1978 NCAA Division I-A football season as a member of the Southland Conference.  NCAA Division I split into Division I-A, the current Football Bowl Subdivision (FBS), and Division I-AA, the current Football Championship Subdivision (FCS), for football in 1978.  Lamar and the Southland Conference opted to compete at the Division I-A level.  The Cardinals played their home games at Cardinal Stadium now named Provost Umphrey Stadium in Beaumont, Texas.  Lamar finished the 1978 season with a 2–8–1 overall record and a 0–5 conference record.  The 1978 season marked Bob Frederick's final season as Lamar's head football coach.

Schedule

References

Lamar
Lamar Cardinals football seasons
Lamar Cardinals football